Ian Harty (born 7 May 1941) is a South African cricketer. He played in 52 first-class and 9 List A matches for Border from 1964/65 to 1981/82.

See also
 List of Border representative cricketers

References

External links
 

1941 births
Living people
South African cricketers
Border cricketers
Cricketers from East London, Eastern Cape